Cyrtodactylus ayeyarwadyensis is a bent-toed gecko species that was discovered in 2001 in Myanmar's Rakhine Yoma Elephant Range and described in 2003.

References

External links 

Cyrtodactylus
Reptiles described in 2003
Taxa named by Aaron M. Bauer